Michelle Kearley is a former Australian child actress. She was cast for the lead role of Molly Wilson in the Australian  children's television series Sugar and Spice and as student Jessie Ross for seven episodes of the Australian  soap opera Neighbours in 1988.

References

External links 
 

Australian child actresses
Australian television actresses
Year of birth missing (living people)
Living people